Moh Keen Ho is a Malaysian former professional snooker player.

Career

Moh turned professional in 2005, as the winner of the ACBS Asian Under-21 Snooker Championship. In his first season on the main tour, he entered four of the ranking tournaments, but was unable to win a match in any. At the Grand Prix, he was whitewashed 5–0 by Ryan Day, while at the UK Championship, he recovered a 0–3 deficit to lead Paul Davies 7–6, but eventually succumbed 7–9.

In the Malta Cup, he lost 2–5 to Hugh Abernethy, and at the China Open, he again failed to win a frame, losing 5–0 to Scott MacKenzie. Moh withdrew from the 2006 World Championship and, having finished the season ranked 92nd, lost his professional status thereafter.

Moh did not play competitively for the next eight years; however, he entered the 2014 World Amateur Championship, where he overcame five opponents, including Lucky Vatnani and Au Chi-wai, to progress from his group. He reached the last 32, but lost, at this stage, 1–5 to compatriot Thor Chuan Leong.

He reached the same stage at the 2015 edition of the tournament, but having led Syria's Karam Fatima 4–2, could not prevent a 4–5 defeat.

Performance and rankings timeline

Career finals

Pro-am finals: 2 (1 title)

Amateur finals: 6 (4 titles)

References

Malaysian snooker players
Living people
Cue sports players at the 2006 Asian Games
Cue sports players at the 2010 Asian Games
Southeast Asian Games gold medalists for Malaysia
Southeast Asian Games silver medalists for Malaysia
Southeast Asian Games bronze medalists for Malaysia
Southeast Asian Games medalists in cue sports
Year of birth missing (living people)
Competitors at the 2005 Southeast Asian Games
Competitors at the 2007 Southeast Asian Games
Competitors at the 2013 Southeast Asian Games
Competitors at the 2015 Southeast Asian Games
Competitors at the 2017 Southeast Asian Games
Asian Games competitors for Malaysia
Competitors at the 2019 Southeast Asian Games
Competitors at the 2021 Southeast Asian Games